E.ON SE is a European multinational electric utility company based in Essen, Germany. It runs one of the world's largest investor-owned electric utility service providers. The name comes from the Latin word aeon, from the Greek aion which means age. The company is a component of the Euro Stoxx 50 stock market index, DAX stock index and a member of the Dow Jones Global Titans 50 index.

It operates in over 30 countries and has nearly 30 million customers. Its chief executive officer is Leonhard Birnbaum.

E.ON was created in 2000 through the merger of VEBA and VIAG.

In 2016, it separated its conventional power generation and energy trading operations into a new company, Uniper, while retaining retail, distribution and nuclear operations. E.ON sold its stake in Uniper through a stock market listing and sold the remaining stock to the Finnish utility Fortum.

In March 2018, it was announced that E.ON would acquire the utility portion of renewable energy utility Innogy through a complex €43 billion asset swap deal between E.ON, Innogy and RWE. The deal was approved by the EU antitrust authorities in September 2019, with final execution taking place in July 2020.

In 2019, E.ON became the first of the "Big Six" UK power companies to switch all of its British electricity customers entirely to renewable electricity. However the company still owns coal power in Turkey.

In 2020, E.ON UK announced that it would be migrating customers over to a new subsidiary brand called E.ON Next. E.ON Next also has two million migrated customers from commercial energy firm npower Business Solutions and Powershop after acquiring both companies.

History
E.ON came into existence in 2000 through the merger of energy companies VEBA and VIAG (Vereinigte Industrieunternehmungen AG, "United Industrial Enterprises Corporation"). In the United Kingdom, Powergen was acquired by E.ON in January 2002. In 2003 E.ON entered the gas market through the €10.3 billion acquisition of Ruhrgas (later: E.ON Ruhrgas). E.ON Ruhrgas was represented in more than 20 countries in Europe.

E.ON also acquired Sydkraft in Sweden and OGK-4 (now: Unipro) in Russia. Sydkraft, Powergen, and OGK-4 were rebranded to E.ON Sverige, E.ON UK, and E.ON Russia respectively. In the United States, E.ON inherited Louisville, Kentucky-based Louisville Gas & Electric Energy, via the acquisition of Powergen, and operated it as E.ON US, until 2010, when E.ON US was sold to Pennsylvania-based PPL for $7.625 billion. The sale was closed on 1 November 2010, with E-ON US becoming LG&E and KU Energy.

E.ON attempted to acquire Endesa in 2006, however this acquisition was overtaken by a joint bid from Italian utility Enel in conjunction with Spanish company Acciona. E.ON acquired about €10 billion of assets that the enlarged Enel was required to divest under EU competition rulings.

In July 2009, the European Commission fined GDF Suez and E.ON €553 million each over arrangements on the MEGAL pipeline. It was the second biggest fine imposed by the European Commission and the first in the energy sector. In 1975, Ruhrgas and Gaz de France concluded a deal according to which they agreed not to sell gas in each other's home market. The deal was abandoned in 2005.

In 2009, E.ON and RWE established an equally owned joint venture Horizon Nuclear Power to develop around 6,000 MWe of new nuclear capacity in the United Kingdom by 2025 at the Wylfa and Oldbury sites. However, in March 2012 E.ON and RWE announced they were pulling out of the project due to difficult financial conditions.

In August 2011, the company announced a possible loss of 10,000 of its 85,600 employees due to the German decision to close all the country's nuclear power stations by 2022, instead of by 2036 as the Bundestag had decided on 28 October 2010.

In May 2014, the UK energy sector regulator Ofgem ordered the company to pay 330,000 of its customers a total of £12 million due to poor sales practices the company engaged in between June 2010 and December 2013. At the time it was the largest penalty levied against a UK energy supplier.

In November 2014, E.ON announced it would abstain from fossil energy in the future. It transferred its fossil energy businesses into a new company, Uniper, which started operating on 1 January 2016. However E.ON still owns coal power in Turkey. E.ON sold a 53% stake in the business through a listing on the Frankfurt Stock Exchange in September 2016. In 2017, it agreed to sell its remaining stake in Uniper to the Finnish power company Fortum. The deal was finalized in June 2018. However, Uniper continues to operate as an independent entity.

In July 2018, E.ON announced that 500 jobs would be lost in the United Kingdom, blaming the energy price cap due to be implemented by Ofgem.

In November 2020, E.ON announced that in the next two years, almost 700 jobs will be cut due to the migration of customers to the new platform that will be completed by the end of 2022.

In 2021, E.ON was ranked no. 56 in the Arctic Environmental Responsibility Index (AERI) that covers 120 oil, gas, and mining companies involved in resource extraction north of the Arctic Circle.

Asset swap with RWE
In March 2018, it was announced that E.ON would acquire renewable energy utility Innogy from its controlling shareholder RWE. The deal resulted in E.ON becoming a pure retail and distribution company. This was achieved through a complex €43 billion asset swap deal between E.ON, Innogy and RWE, where E.ON took over Innogy's retail and distribution business, while RWE took over both Innogy's renewable energy generation portfolio as well as E.ON's remaining energy generation assets. In addition, RWE took a 16.7% stake in E.ON and E.ON received a cash payment of €1.5 billion. The deal was finalized in September 2019.

Financial data

Operations
E.ON is one of the major public utility companies in Europe and the world's largest investor-owned energy service provider. As result of mergers, E.ON inherited the subsidiaries of VEBA, VIAG and Ruhrgas in Central and Eastern Europe. E.ON is present in most of Scandinavia.

E.ON is organized into the following business areas:
 Customer Solutions
 Energy Networks
 Renewables

Nuclear energy

E.ON subsidiary PreussenElektra GmbH operates the Brokdorf, Grohnde, and Isar 2 nuclear power plants. It is decommissioning Isar 1, Grafenrheinfeld, Unterweser, Stade and Würgassen nuclear power plants. It also holds minority stakes in the RWE-operated Gundremmingen and Emsland NPPs. According to the assets swap deal between E.ON and RWE, RWE will acquire these minority stakes.

Windfarm projects
E.ON was a major wind energy player across multiple countries. In October 2019, the renewable energy division EC&R was sold to competitor RWE. The sale included EC&R's assets in the UK, Sweden, Germany, Poland and the US.  Notably E.ON UK, owned 30% of the London Array project, which is a 630 MW wind generation farm in the Thames estuary. Another notable wind farm is Roscoe, which was the largest in the world at the time of completion, and for a number of years afterwards.

Coal
Tufanbeyli coal fired power station in Turkey, is 50% owned by E.ON.

Business services
E.ON Digital Technology (previously E.ON Business Services until January 2019, E.ON IT and is:energy) is the IT service provider of the energy company E.ON. It bundles business services for finance and HR as well as IT under a single roof and employs around 3,800 people. These are located at four legal entities in Germany (EBS GmbH, EBS Berlin GmbH, EBS Hanover GmbH and EBS Regensburg GmbH); plus legal entities in ten further countries (Belgium, Netherlands, Luxembourg, Czech Republic, Hungary, Italy, Romania, Slovakia, Sweden and United Kingdom).

Sponsorship

Sports
E.ON UK sponsored the FA Cup for four years, from 2006 to the end of the 2009/10 football season. The four-year deal which included the FA Women's Cup and the FA Youth Cup was worth around £40 million. E.ON is the official energy partner of The Football League and sponsors a collection of home programmes on Channel Five in the UK. E.ON has previously sponsored ITV Weather, the Ipswich Town football club and the Rugby Cup.

Between 2000 and 2006, E.ON was the main kit sponsor of German Bundesliga club Borussia Dortmund.

E.ON Ruhrgas is the main sponsor of the IBU biathlon World Cup and is the main sponsor of the Ski jumping World Cup.

E.ON Sverige sponsored the home arena of Swedish ice hockey team Timrå IK from 2003 to 2015.

E.ON was one of the main sponsors of 2007–2008 Dutch Eredivisie Champions PSV Eindhoven.

Arts
Between 1998 and 2014, E.ON and its predecessor company VEBA spent more than Euro30 million  ($41 million) supporting the Museum Kunstpalast, located next to the corporate headquarters in Düsseldorf.

In 2014, E.ON decided to sell Jackson Pollock's Number 5 (Elegant Lady) (1951), a painting the company has owned since 1980, at Christie's auction to keep funding the Museum Kunstpalast. Pollock had swapped it in 1954 with New York gallery owner Martha Jackson for the convertible in which he had a fatal accident two years later. In 1980, Ulrich Hartmann, head of VEBA's corporate board office, pushed for the purchase from art dealer Alfred Schmela. The acquisition was considered the foundation for E.ON's art collection of more than 1,800 works.

E.ON is also sponsor of Brain Bar, a Budapest-based, annually held festival on the future.

Facilities
 Elbe Crossing 1
 Elbe Crossing 2
 GKK Etzenricht
 Baltic Cable (operated in cooperation with Baltic-Cable AB)

See also

 European Transmission System Operators
 Gesellschaft für Nuklear-Service
 Power to gas
 Scroby Sands wind farm

References

External links
 
 

 
2000 establishments in Germany
Companies based in North Rhine-Westphalia
Companies based in Essen
German brands
Holding companies established in 2000
Multinational companies headquartered in Germany
Natural gas companies of Germany
Electric power companies of Germany
Wind power companies of the United States
Electric power distribution network operators in Sweden